Junos OS (also known as Juniper Junos, Junos and JUNOS) is a FreeBSD-based network operating system used in Juniper Networks routing, switching and security devices.

Versioning
Junos OS was first made available on 7 July 1998, with new feature updates being released every quarter  2008. JUNOS Senior Product Manager Michael Bushong attributed the release speed to Juniper's strategic decision to maintain a single operating system across routing and switching platforms. This decision contrasts with vendors such as Cisco, who maintain several different operating systems for different products. , the latest version is Junos OS 22.2, released on 23 July 2022.

Architecture
Junos operating system is primarily based on Linux and FreeBSD, with Linux running as bare metal, and FreeBSD running in a QEMU Virtual machine. Because FreeBSD is a Unix implementation, customers can access a Unix shell and execute normal Unix commands. Junos runs on most or all Juniper hardware systems. After Juniper acquired NetScreen, it integrated ScreenOS security functions into its own Junos network operating system.
Junos OS has several architecture variations:
 Juniper’s flagship Junos OS is based on the FreeBSD operating system and can run as a guest virtual machine (VM) on a Linux VM host. 
 Juniper’s next-generation operating system, Junos OS evolved, runs native Linux and provides direct access to Linux utilities and operations. 
Both operating systems use the same command-line interface (CLI) user interface, the same applications and features and the same management and automation tools—but Junos OS evolved infrastructure has been entirely modernized to enable higher availability, accelerated deployment, greater innovation, and improved operational efficiencies.

Features

Junos SDK
Juniper offers a Software Development Kit (SDK) to partners and customers to allow additional customization. Through the Juniper Developer Network (JDN) Juniper Networks provides the Junos SDK to its customers and 3rd-party developers who want to develop applications for Junos-powered devices such as Juniper Networks routers, switches, and service gateway systems. It provides a set of tools and application programming interfaces (APIs), including interfaces to Junos routing, firewall filter, UI and traffic services functions. Juniper Networks also employs the Junos SDK internally to develop parts of Junos and many Junos applications such as OpenFlow for Junos, and other traffic services.

Command-line interface
The Junos OS command-line interface (CLI) is a text-based command interface for configuring, troubleshooting, and monitoring the Juniper device and network traffic associated with it. It supports two types of command modes.
 Operational Mode – Monitors hardware status and displays information about network data that passes through or into the hardware.
 Configuration Mode – Configures the Juniper router, switch, or security device, by adding, deleting, or modifying statements in the configuration hierarchy.

FIPS 140-2 security compliance
For advanced network security, a special version of Junos OS called Junos-FIPS 140-2 Security Compliance is available, providing customers with software tools to configure a network of Juniper Networks devices in a Federal Information Processing Standards (FIPS) environment.

Juniper Extension Toolkit (JET)
Junos OS offers programming interfaces and the Juniper Extension Toolkit (JET) for developing applications that unlock more value from the network. JET is a standard component of Junos OS, and it runs on all Juniper routers, switches, and security devices. JET simplifies the automation of operational, configuration, and management tasks, providing a rich set of open and customizable APIs for control, management, and data planes. It supports standardized programming languages for application development and communication to the Junos OS fast programmable database through standardized and open data exchange formats. It also opens up Trio and Express ASICs via a set of third-party controller-specific adapters, including SAI, OpenFlow, and P4.

Junos Fusion
Junos Fusion helps reduce network complexity and operational expenses by enabling multiple distributed devices to be managed as a single, logical device. Two different Junos Fusion architectures are available, one for provider edge and one for enterprise.

Node slicing
Node slicing is a Junos OS feature that enables creating multiple partitions from one physical MX Series router. Each partition behaves as an independent router, with its own dedicated control plane, data plane, and management plane, allowing it to run multiple services on one physical router.

Routing protocols and applications
Junos OS supports a variety of routing protocols and applications. It also supports class of service (CoS), Ethernet VPN (EVPN), firewall filters and policers, flow monitoring, and Layer 2 features. It's a flexible routing policy language that is used for controlling route advertisements and path selection. Junos OS generally adheres to industry standards for routing and Multiprotocol Label Switching (MPLS). The Junos OS supports high availability mechanisms that are not standard to Unix, such as Graceful Restart. Junos supports a variety of routing protocols. With the introduction of the SRX and J-series (past version 9.3) platforms, it also supports "flow mode", which includes stateful firewalling, NAT, and IPsec. Junos generally adheres to industry standards for routing and MPLS.

Secure boot
Secure boot is a significant system security enhancement based on the Unified Extensible Firmware Interface (UEFI) standard. It works by safeguarding the Basic Input/Output System (BIOS) from tampering or modification and then maintaining that protection throughout the boot process. The secure boot process begins with secure flash, which ensures that unauthorized changes cannot be made to the firmware. Authorized releases of Junos OS carry a digital signature produced by either Juniper Networks directly or one of its authorized partners.

Market share 
, Juniper maintains a market share in Ethernet Switching of 16.9% and a market share in Enterprise Routing of 16.1%. Juniper generated a $2,353 million revenue in Routing, $858 million in Switching, and $318 million in Security during 2016.

Most of Juniper's revenue stems from The Americas ($2,969 million), with Europe, Middle East, and Africa ($1,238 million), and Asia ($783 million) combining for the rest of their annual revenue as of 2016.

Benefits 
Key benefits of Junos OS, as advertised by Juniper Networks, include: 
 Modular design: Every process and component in a Juniper network setup is shielded from every other. One module crashing will have no effect on the rest of the system.
 Single train compatibility: Every Juniper switch, router, or other product runs the same JUNOS system. The system is built for simple inter-operability across the system.

References

External links 
 
 Juniper Networks to Use Oracle Berkeley DB in JUNOS Software

Computer networking
Embedded operating systems
FreeBSD
Juniper Networks
Network operating systems
1998 software